Philip Thomas Kueber (November 17, 1934 – November 23, 2009) was a Canadian Lawyer and Olympic rower, earning a silver medal in the 1956 Olympics in Melbourne, Australia.  He was born in Galahad, Alberta and attended St. Edwards from 1946 to 1950. He received a law degree from the University of British Columbia in 1956. While at UBC, he joined the rowing team under the tutelage of Frank Read.  
In 1954 his team won a gold at the Commonwealth games.
In July 1955 they beat the Russians who had won the gold a year before.

See also
Rowing at the 1956 Summer Olympics

References
Philip Kueber's obituary

1934 births
2009 deaths
Sportspeople from British Columbia
Canadian male rowers
Rowers at the 1956 Summer Olympics
Olympic silver medalists for Canada
Olympic rowers of Canada
Sportspeople from Alberta
Olympic medalists in rowing
University of British Columbia alumni
Medalists at the 1956 Summer Olympics
Peter A. Allard School of Law alumni
20th-century Canadian people